Newscast is a British podcast and television programme produced by BBC News. It takes a look at the day’s main news, political events and talking points. It is the most listened to podcast on BBC Sounds and consistently ranks as the most popular news podcast in the United Kingdom. It is presented by BBC chief political correspondent Adam Fleming with political editor Chris Mason.

History
Originally launched as an audio podcast in 2017 to cover that year's general election and titled Electioncast, it was subsequently renamed Brexitcast. Its first televised edition was transmitted in September 2019, and it was relaunched in its current format in February 2020. The decision to relaunch the podcast came in January 2020, when it was announced that Brexitcast would be renamed Newscast after the United Kingdom's exit from the European Union on 31 January. The final edition of Brexitcast was released on 1 February 2020, with the first edition of Newscast airing on 6 February.

A daily version of the podcast titled The Coronavirus Newscast was launched on 18 March 2020 to cover the coronavirus pandemic. On 13 July 2020 it reverted to Newscast. Regular guest presenters include Marianna Spring and Jane Garvey.

On 18 October 2022, hundreds of subscribers watched a live recording of Newscast with its sister podcasts Americast (which talks about American politics) and  Ukrainecast (which talks about the Russian invasion of Ukraine) in the BBC Radio Theatre for the inaugural Castfest Live.

In January 2023, a non news spin-off was announced called Eurovisioncast, presented by Eurovision Song Contest 2016 winner Måns Zelmerlöw, journalist Nina Warhurst, BBC News Eurovision reporter Daniel Rosney, and BBC Radio Merseyside's Ngunan Adamu, based on the 2023 Eurovision Song Contest being hosted in Liverpool.

Notable guests 
The then Duke of Cambridge discussed the first round of his Earthshot Prize when the podcast visited Kensington Palace. 

Swedish climate change activist Greta Thunberg was interviewed on Newscast when she published her book about climate change.

The former Prime Minister Tony Blair has appeared several times.

References

External links
Newscast (podcast version) at BBC Online
Newscast (radio version) at BBC Online
Newscast (TV version) at BBC Online

2020 podcast debuts
Political podcasts
BBC television news shows
2020 in radio
2020 British television series debuts
Audio podcasts
British podcasts